The Burmilla is a breed of domestic cat that originated in the United Kingdom in 1981. It is a cross between the Chinchilla Persian and Burmese cats. Standards were produced in 1984, and the breed gained championship status in the United Kingdom in the 1990s.

Origin
The Burmilla was born in the United Kingdom. Two cats, a Chinchilla Persian named Sanquist and a Brown Tortie Burmese named Fabergé, were both awaiting a partner in different rooms. One night, the cleaner left the door open. The two cats mated, producing four kittens born in 1981; also birthing a new breed.

In GCCF (Governing Council of the Cat Fancy), the Burmilla is considered part of the Asian group. It is accepted in FIFe as the Burmilla. Only the Shaded Silver and Silver Tipped varieties have been recognized in FIFe, CCCA, ACF and CFA. 

As of late 2011, the Shaded Golden and Golden Tipped Burmilla are recognized within FIFe. One governing body in Australia has used the name Australian Tiffanie; however, international acceptance and standardization did not follow. The name "Tiffany" has been used to describe many breeds, having an appearance from the Ragdoll to the Birman, and may contain any of these breeds and more. Many Australian Tiffanies contain more than three-quarters Chinchilla Persian and retain the appearance and temperament of the Old-Fashioned Chinchilla Persian. The name's use is declining in favour, due to the lax standards for the breed name, the lack of unique identity and the varied genetic makeup.

Appearance

Body
Burmillas are medium-sized with muscular, elegant bodies, tending to weigh between 3–6 kg. Their distinguishing feature is their sparkling silver coat, and distinctive “make up” lining the nose, lips and eyes.

Head
Gently rounded top of head; medium width between ears; wide at eyebrow level and jaw hinge, tapering to a short, blunt wedge.  The profile shows a gentle nose break.  Tip of nose and chin should be in line.  Chin is firm, with good depth.

Ears and eyes
Medium to large, broad at base with slightly rounded tips.  Ear set with slight forward tilt in profile.  Eye shape is large; placed well apart at slight oblique setting; slightly curved upper; line angled toward the nose, with a fuller curved lower line.  Eye color luminous, any shade of green. Some allowance can be made for a gold or yellow tinge in kittens and young adults.

Coat
The Burmilla comes in two coat lengths, semi-longhair and shorthair. Semi-longhair Burmilla are known as the Tiffanie in GCCF. The most common (standard) coat is the shorthair. This is a short, close-lying coat, similar in appearance to the Burmese, but with a slightly padded feel. Due to the undercoat, it has a soft, silky feel. The recessive longhair gene inherited from the Chinchilla Persian can produce longhair Burmilla. These cats have a semi-longhair coat following the lines of the body, with a soft, silky feel and a large plumed tail. The shorthair gene is dominant and where a cat receives one of each, shorthair dominates. Two longhair Burmillas mated together produce longhair kittens, while shorthair matings depend on whether the longhair genes are carried by the shorthair parents.

Colours
The Burmilla sports a variety of coat colours, including black, blue, brown, chocolate and lilac. Red, cream and tortoiseshell (calico) varieties have been bred, although these colours are not recognized by CCCA in Australia. Burmilla coat colours can be expressed in either Burmese expression, or full expression. The Burmilla is now recognized in Shaded Golden and Golden Tipped in FIFe registries, but only Shaded Silver and Silver Tipped elsewhere. The Burmilla's shading comes in two major coat patterns which relate to the depth of colour. These are Tipped and Shaded. Tipped Burmillas have a light dusting of colour (1/8 to 1/4) over the top of a silver or golden undercoat. In the case of Silvers, these cats can appear almost white. Shaded Burmillas have 1/4 - 1/2 as their colour, giving the appearance of a mantle of colour over the back, shoulders and outside of the legs. Smoke pattern is not a Burmilla and in some registries is only allowed to be registered for breeding, not showing, they have almost all colour with only a faint pale base to each hair. The cats have nose leather coloured correspondingly to their coat colour and outlined in the matching coat shading colour. In addition, their paw pads correspond to the coat colouring: Black Silver cats have black or dark brown paw pads, Brown has dark brown, Chocolate has pinkish brown, Blues have Blue-grey and Lilacs have Dove grey tinged with pink.

Colour genetics
Since the Burmilla inherits its colour ranges from two breeds, there is also the possibility of the entire Burmese spectrum of colours (Black, Brown, Blue, Chocolate, Lilac and all the O gene range, both in Burmese Expression and in Full Expression). The inheritance of Silver also means that expression of colour can be variable; silver can darken and cool colour. However, since the Burmilla has a shaded coat pattern, it can be difficult to identify the various subtle shades of Burmese colouring that are recessive to the Persian colouring.

Temperament
                                                    
The Burmilla is an irreverent and independent cat who adores its owner and displays many kitten-like characteristics, even into adulthood. In temperament they are sociable, playful and affectionate and get along well with children and other animals.

Notes

References

External links
Burmese-Burmilla Pedigree Database
Remedies For Constipated Cat
FBRL Breed Page: Asian

Cat breeds
Cat breeds originating in the United Kingdom